A boot disk is a removable digital data storage medium from which a computer can load and run (boot) an operating system or utility program. The computer must have a built-in program which will load and execute a program from a boot disk meeting certain standards.

While almost all modern computers can boot from a hard drive containing the operating system and other software, they would not normally be called boot disks (because they are not removable media). CD-ROMs are the most common forms of media used, but other media, such as magnetic or paper tape drives, ZIP drives, and more recently USB flash drives can be used. The computer's BIOS must support booting from the device in question.

One can make one's own boot disk (typically done to prepare for when the system won't start properly).

Uses 
Boot disks are used for:

 Operating system installation
 Data recovery
 Data purging
 Hardware or software troubleshooting
 BIOS flashing
 Customizing an operating environment
 Software demonstration
 Running a temporary operating environment, such as when using a Live USB drive.
 Administrative access in case of lost password is possible with an appropriate boot disk with some operating systems
 Games (e.g. for Amiga home computers, running MS-DOS video games on modern computers by using a bootable MS-DOS or FreeDOS USB flash drive).

Process 
The term boot comes from the idea of lifting oneself by one's own bootstraps: the computer contains a tiny program (bootstrap loader) which will load and run a program found on a boot device. This program may itself be a small program designed to load a larger and more capable program, i.e., the full operating system. To enable booting without the requirement either for a mass storage device or to write to the boot medium, it is usual for the boot program to use some system RAM as a RAM disk for temporary file storage.

As an example, any computer compatible with the IBM PC is able with built-in software to load the contents of the first 512 bytes of a floppy  and to execute it if it is a viable program; boot floppies have a very simple loader program in these bytes. The process is vulnerable to abuse; data floppies could have a virus written to their first sector which silently infects the host computer if switched on with the disk in the drive.

Media 
Bootable floppy disks ("boot floppies") for PCs usually contain DOS or miniature versions of Linux. The most commonly available floppy disk can hold only 1.4 MB of data in its standard format, making it impractical for loading large operating systems. The use of boot floppies is in decline, due to the availability of other higher-capacity options, such as CD-ROMs or USB flash drives.

Device selection
A modern PC is configured to attempt to boot from various devices in a certain order. More recent BIOSes permit the interruption of the final stage of the boot process and invoke the Boot Menu by pressing a function key (usually  or ). This results in a list of bootable devices being presented, from which a selection may be made.

Requirements 
Different operating systems use different boot disk contents. All boot disks must be compatible with the computer they are designed for.

 MS-DOS/PC DOS/DR-DOS
A valid boot sector in form of a volume boot record (VBR)
IO.SYS or IBMBIO.COM
MSDOS.SYS or IBMDOS.COM
COMMAND.COM
All files must be for the same version of the operating system. Complete boot disks can be prepared in one operation by an installed operating system; details vary.

 FreeDOS
A valid boot sector on the disk
COMMAND.COM
KERNEL.SYS

 Linux
A bootloader such as SYSLINUX or GRUB
Linux kernel
Initial ram disk (initrd)

 Windows Preinstallation Environment
Windows Boot Manager
BOOT.WIM

See also
 Darik's Boot and Nuke
 Data recovery
 El Torito (CD-ROM standard)
 Live CD
 Protected Area Run Time Interface Extension Services (PARTIES)
 Self-loader

References

External links 
 reboot.pro - Community forum dedicated to Boot Disks
 Boot Disk information, sources, and tools

Bootable media